Erigeron arenarioides is a species of flowering plant in the family Asteraceae known by the common names sand fleabane and  Wasatch fleabane. It has been found only in  the northern part of the state of Utah in the western United States.

Erigeron arenarioides is a perennial up to 30 cm (1 foot) tall. It usually has several flower heads, each with 10–25 blue ray florets surrounding a disc with many small yellow disc florets. The Latin epithet arenarioides means "sandwort-like," referring to its narrow leaves.

References

arenarioides
Flora of Utah
Plants described in 1871
Flora without expected TNC conservation status